United Nations Security Council Resolution 2077 was unanimously adopted on 21 November 2012. The Security Council renewed for another year the authorizations, first agreed in 2008, for international action to fight the crimes in cooperation with the new Somali Government, whom it requested to create a national legal framework for the effort.

See also 
List of United Nations Security Council Resolutions 2001 to 2100

References

External links
Text of the Resolution at undocs.org

2012 United Nations Security Council resolutions
 2077
2012 in Somalia
November 2012 events